David Anthony Francia (born 16 April 1975) is an Italian baseball player who competed in the 2004 Summer Olympics.

References

1975 births
Living people
Olympic baseball players of Italy
Baseball players at the 2004 Summer Olympics
Batavia Clippers players
Clearwater Phillies players
Nashua Pride players
Piedmont Boll Weevils players
Grosseto Baseball Club players
Reading Phillies players
Scranton/Wilkes-Barre Red Barons players
T & A San Marino players
American expatriate baseball players in San Marino
Baseball players from St. Petersburg, Florida
South Alabama Jaguars baseball players